Seth Manfield (born September 14, 1990) is an American Magic: The Gathering player, perhaps best known for winning the 2015 World Championship. His other accomplishments include sixth-place finish at Pro Tour Fate Reforged earlier that same year, and five Grand Prix wins. In 2018, he was inducted into the Magic: The Gathering Hall of Fame. In 2020, he was signed on by Team Envy.

He is the son of bridge world champion Ed Manfield (1943–1999).

Achievements

Family 
His father is Ed Manfield, a champion bridge player. He has a daughter born in 2015.

References 

Living people
American Magic: The Gathering players
People from Chevy Chase, Maryland
Players who have won the Magic: The Gathering World Championship
1991 births